Kaki (also Romanized as Kākī) is a city in Kaki District of Dashti County, Bushehr province, Iran. At the 2006 census, its population was 9,893 in 1,983 households. The following census in 2011 counted 10,156 people in 2,519 households. The latest census in 2016 showed a population of 12,119 people in 3,237 households.

See also

2013 Bushehr earthquake

References 

Cities in Bushehr Province
Populated places in Dashti County